Tú may refer to:

 Tú (Canadian band)
 "Tú" (Noelia song), 1999
 "Tú" (Shakira song), 1998
 "Tú", a 2008 song by Belle Perez
 "Tú", an habanera written by Eduardo Sánchez de Fuentes
 "Tú", a 1987 song by Juan Luis Guerra from Mientras Más Lo Pienso...Tú
 "Tú", a 2007 song by Jeremías from Un día más en el gran circo
 "Tú", a 2007 song by Kudai from Sobrevive
 "Tú", a 1991 song by Mecano from Aidalai
 "Tú", a 2010 song by Sara Tunes from Butterfly
 The familiar form of "you" in the Spanish language
 "La Incondicional", a 1989 song by Luis Miguel, sometimes confused by fans as being named "Tú"
 Tú, a Chinese surname

See also
Tu (disambiguation)